Zaraqoli-ye Pain (also Romanized as Zarāqolī-ye Pā’īn; also known as Zarāqolī-ye Soflá) is a village in Howmeh-ye Gharbi Rural District, in the Central District of Ramhormoz County, Khuzestan Province, Iran. At the 2006 census, its population was 454, in 90 families.

References 

Populated places in Ramhormoz County